Novosti Sistematiki Vysshikh Rastenii, (abrev. Novosti Sist. Vyssh. Rast.; Novitates Systematicae Plantarum non Vascularium in English), is a magazine with botanic illustrations and descriptions, edited in the USSR since 1964. The founders were 
the botanists of the Komarov Botanical Institute. Its headquarters is in Saint Petersburg. The frequency of the magazine is biannual.

References

External links
Description in IPNI

Botany journals
Magazines established in 1964
Russian-language magazines
Science and technology magazines published in Russia
Magazines published in the Soviet Union
Magazines published in Saint Petersburg
Biannual magazines
Russian Academy of Sciences academic journals